Terbegovci is a settlement in the Municipality of Sveti Jurij ob Ščavnici in northeastern Slovenia. The area is part of the traditional Styria region and is now included in the Mura Statistical Region.

References

External links
Terbegovci at Geopedia

Populated places in the Municipality of Sveti Jurij ob Ščavnici